"The Stone Age" (also known as "Archaeologists" and "Dinosaur" and as "Tyrannosaurus Rex" and also as "Pot-Holing" and "Let's Go Pot-Holing") is an episode of the British comedy television series The Goodies. Written by The Goodies, with songs and music by Bill Oddie.

Plot
It is the weekend and the Goodies are happy about this, but whilst Graeme reads, Bill's and Tim's hobbies are getting on each other's nerves, so they decide to do neither and tell Graeme that they are bored.  Graeme is no longer happy because they disturbed him.  He then explains the book he is reading is about the prehistoric age. Then, while explaining, Graeme thinks there are prehistoric fossils under the office and falls down a deep hole.

Bill and Tim decide to rescue him, but Tim confesses he is not going down. Bill goes in the hole alone but, when he goes down the hole, he pulls Tim down too.

They both fall to the bottom, where they find Graeme has turned a tunnel into the Goodies' own tunnel. They find a Tyrannosaurus rex with its mouth open and look into the mouth, when it suddenly closes on them.

They discover they cannot get back out of the dinosaur's mouth, so decide to travel through the creature till they reach its stomach. They are stuck there for a long time, until Graeme comes up with an idea — they will shout through the Tyrannosaurus Rex. So Bill shouts for help, but ends up waking the creature. When the creature's mouth opens, they all run out and climb back up the hole to their office.  Graeme states he wishes he could have a better examination of the creature, when it smashes through the floor and tips the office over.

References

 "The Complete Goodies" — Robert Ross, B T Batsford, London, 2000
 "The Goodies Rule OK" — Robert Ross, Carlton Books Ltd, Sydney, 2006
 "From Fringe to Flying Circus — 'Celebrating a Unique Generation of Comedy 1960-1980'" — Roger Wilmut, Eyre Methuen Ltd, 1980
 "The Goodies Episode Summaries" — Brett Allender
 "The Goodies — Fact File" — Matthew K. Sharp

External links
 

The Goodies (series 4) episodes
1973 British television episodes